Margrave Otto V of Brandenburg-Salzwedel ( 1246 – 1298), nicknamed Otto the Tall, was a son of Margrave Otto III and co-ruler of Brandenburg with his cousin, Margrave Otto IV.

Otto V spent many years in Prague, at the court of his maternal uncle King Ottokar II of Bohemia.  When Ottokar died in battle in 1278, Otto V became the regent for Ottokar's son and heir Wenceslaus II, who was only seven years old when his father died.  As regent, Otto V had to deal with the machinations of Ottokar's widow Kunigunda of Slavonia and with factions of powerful noblemen.  Bohemian chroniclers describe Otto's persistent rigour and that Wenceslaus was forced to give up his claims on Upper Lusatia before he could start reigning himself.  When Wenceslaus had taken over, he and Otto V were still on good terms, and Wenceslaus took measures against the strong influence of the group around his mother.

Otto V also persistently defended his claims on Pomerania against Polish counter-claims.

Marriage and issue 
He married with Judith of Henneberg-Coburg, a daughter of Count Herman I of Henneberg.  They had the following children:
 Matilda (c. 1270 – before 1 June 1298), the second wife of Henry IV Probus, Duke of Wrocław and High Duke of Poland
 Herman (c. 1275 – 1 February 1308), his successor
 Otto (died 1307)
 Kunigunde (died 1317), never married
 Beatrix (d. c. 1316),  married Bolko I the Strict, Duke of Świdnica in 1284
 Judith (also known as Jutta; died: 9 May 1328), married Rudolph I, Duke of Saxe-Wittenberg in 1303
 Albert (before 1283 – c. 1296)

References

External links 
Otto the Tall as Regent of Bohemia
Entry at www.genealogie-mittelalter.de

Margraves of Brandenburg
House of Ascania
1240s births
Year of birth uncertain
1298 deaths
13th-century German nobility